The 2016–16 UTEP Miners basketball team represented the University of Texas at El Paso during the 2016–17 NCAA Division I men's basketball season. The Miners, led by seventh-year head coach Tim Floyd, played their home games at the Don Haskins Center as members of Conference USA. They finished the season 15–17, 12–6 in C-USA play to finish in a tie for third place. In the C-USA tournament, they defeated Rice in the quarterfinals before losing to top-seeded Middle Tennessee in the semifinals.  UTEP averaged 6,400 fans per game, ranking 83rd nationally.

Previous season
The Miners finished the 2015–16 season 19–14, 10–8 in C-USA play to finish in sixth place. They defeated FIU in the second round of the C-USA tournament to advance to the quarterfinals where they lost to Marshall.

Preseason 
The Miners were picked to finish in sixth place in the preseason Conference USA poll.

Departures

Class of 2016 recruits

Class of 2017 recruits

Roster

Schedule and results

|-
!colspan=9 style=| Exhibition

|-
!colspan=9 style=| Non-conference regular season

|-
!colspan=12 style=| Conference USA regular season

|-
!colspan=9 style=| Conference USA tournament

See also
2016–17 UTEP Lady Miners basketball team

References

UTEP Miners men's basketball seasons
UTEP